The Mothership Space Net Penthouse is an aerial hammock in Moab, Utah, hand-woven from 14,000 feet of cordage and rigged by the Desert Rats, a group of more than 50 people spearheaded by slackliner Andy Lewis, during Thanksgiving 2014.

The net is suspended over 400 feet above the ground, in a pentagon shape covering approximately 2000 square feet, with five lines going out to the surrounding cliffs. It took Lewis several years to acquire all of the proper materials to build it.  Highliners walk across the five different legs of the net (which are as long as 80 meters or 262 feet), and BASE jumpers leap from the human-sized hole in the middle of the net.  The pentagonal web is over 200 feet away from the nearest cliff.

References

External links
 Mother Nature Network pictures of the Space Net
 Bored Panda pictures of the Space Net

Buildings and structures in Moab, Utah